is a Japanese footballer.

Career
After leaving the Yokohama F. Marinos of his native Japan and travelling to Argentina, Gotou spent a few months training with Argentinos Juniors, before playing for various lower division clubs. He signed for Almirante Brown in 2018 and scored on his debut, in a 2-2 draw with Tristán Suárez.

He signed for Liniers ahead of the 2022 season.

Career statistics

Club

Notes

References

1996 births
Living people
People from Kamakura
Association football people from Kanagawa Prefecture
Japanese footballers
Association football forwards
Primera B Metropolitana players
Yokohama F. Marinos players
Argentinos Juniors footballers
Deportivo Merlo footballers
Club Social y Deportivo Liniers players
Japanese expatriate footballers
Japanese expatriate sportspeople in Argentina
Expatriate footballers in Argentina